"Divine Sorrow" is a song by Haitian hip hop recording artist Wyclef Jean from his EP "J'ouvert". Credited with the mononym Wyclef on the official cover of the single, it also features Swedish DJ and producer Avicii. The song was released as the lead single from the album on November 17, 2014. It was written by Magnus Lidehäll, Salem Al Fakir, and Vincent Pontare.

Background
Wyclef Jean recorded the song with Avicii in Stockholm, Sweden in the winter of 2013. The song was released on November 17, 2014, as part of the campaign "Share the Sound of an AIDS-Free Generation" by Product Red project (stylized as (RED) or as (PRODUCT)RED), a licensed brand that seeks to engage the private sector in raising awareness and funds to help fight the spread of HIV/AIDS in Africa.

This specific song was commissioned through (Coca-Cola)RED. Proceeds from the song benefited the Global Fund to Fight AIDS, Tuberculosis and Malaria.

Wyclef Jean said of the song, "The whole idea with the song is, it's a celebration song. No matter what you're going through today, you're going to overcome it tomorrow."

The song is written in the key of C Major at a tempo of 130 bpm.

Music video

A colorful lyrics music video was released on 17 November 2014 with the red colour prominent in the video symbolizing the red campaign. A full music video is yet to be released for the song.

Chart performance
"Divine Sorrow" debuted at number 12 on Billboard's Hot Dance/Electronic Songs chart, becoming Avicii's 13th single on the chart. The song also debuted at number 3 on the Dance/Electronic Digital Songs chart, selling 29,000 copies in its first week.

Track listing

In popular culture
Wyclef and Avicii performed the track for the first time on August 24, 2014, in Ushuaia Ibiza, Spain.

On November 23, 2014, Wyclef Jean also performed a few brief verses from "Divine Sorrow" during the 2014 American Music Awards as an intro to a duet with MAGIC! in the latter's song "Rude". The medley was released on iTunes as a download under the title "Divine Sorrow/Rude (Medley) (2014 American Music Awards)".

Charts

Weekly charts

Year-end charts

References

Avicii songs
Wyclef Jean songs
2014 songs
Songs written by Vincent Pontare
2014 singles